Gankhuurai Battungalag is a Mongolian diplomat.

Education
Battungalag studied at the Moscow State Institute of International Relations, Russia;  Victoria University of Wellington, New Zealand; and the Harvard Kennedy School, United States.

Career

On 10 May 2017 she presented her credentials as the permanent representative of Mongolia at the Vienna office of the United Nations.

She was Mongolia's ambassador to Austria, Bosnia and Herzegovina, Croatia, Montenegro and Slovenia from 2017 to 2021, and at the end of this term was appointed as the honorary president of the Austro-Mongolian society OTSCHIR.

 she held the post of Director General of the Department for Europe of the Ministry of Foreign Affairs of Mongolia.

References

Year of birth missing (living people)
Living people
Mongolian women diplomats
Permanent Representatives of Mongolia to the United Nations
Ambassadors of Mongolia to Bosnia and Herzegovina
Ambassadors of Mongolia to Croatia
Ambassadors of Mongolia to Montenegro
Ambassadors of Mongolia to Slovenia
Moscow State Institute of International Relations alumni
Victoria University of Wellington alumni
Harvard Kennedy School alumni